The Walkham is a river whose source is on Dartmoor, Devon, England. It rises in the wide gap between Roos Tor and Great Mis Tor and flows almost due south for approximately  leaving the tors and thus National Park behind then south-west for  past Woodtown. The river then reaches a village, Horrabridge, with a small compact network of streets mainly on the south or left bank. It receives most of its tributaries which are unnamed headwaters along its south-flowing inception, draining the near side of two series of six tors (peaks) to the west ending in Pew Tor at 320 metres and likewise to the east ending in Leeden Tor at 389 metres (above mean sea level).

Trivia

The confluence of the Walkham and Tavy is a few hundred metres downstream from the Tavistock Canal a mainly closed canal with many mining heritage centres, leading to the Tavy's near-neighbour, the River Tamar - see the Cornwall and West Devon Mining Landscape World Heritage Site.

See also
 Rivers of the United Kingdom

External links

Rivers of Devon
Dartmoor
2Walkham